Reuben Duran (born July 2, 1983) is an American professional mixed martial artist currently competing in the Flyweight division. A professional since 2006, he has competed for the UFC, Shooto, and King of the Cage. He is the current King of the Cage Light Flyweight Champion, as well as the former Interim Flyweight Champion.

Background
Duran started training martial arts at the age of seven. By the time he turned 14 he had added boxing to training regimen and by 19 was training in all aspects of MMA including the additions of wrestling, Brazilian jiu-jitsu, and Muay Thai.

Mixed martial arts career

Early career
Reuben began his career with multiple fights for King of the Cage, and other small promotions in California. As an amateur competitor, Duran has distinguished himself by being a six time winner of Grapplers Quest.

In a memorable match, Duran fought Greg Guzman, hiding his injuries that included 2 torn ligaments in his right hand. In spite of the injuries, Duran still earned the victory. Later, in an interview, Duran voiced his confidence that were it not for the injury, he would have gotten a stoppage. Duran would support his bold statement in his next fight as he claimed a victory over Ryan Diaz via KO with only 3 seconds left in the fight. In subsequent bouts, Duran submitted both Kana Hyatt and Maurice Eazel in the first round.

Ultimate Fighting Championship
Duran signed with the UFC in early 2011 and made his debut at UFC on Versus 3 against Takeya Mizugaki, replacing an injured Francisco Rivera. Duran lost the fight via close split decision.

Duran faced Francisco Rivera on June 4, 2011 at The Ultimate Fighter 13 Finale. He won the fight via submission in the third round, earning Submission of the Night honors.

Duran next faced Hugo Viana on December 15, 2012 at The Ultimate Fighter: Team Carwin vs. Team Nelson Finale. After being knocked down twice, he eventually lost the fight via KO late in the first round.

Duran then faced George Roop on March 16, 2013 at UFC 158. He lost the fight via unanimous decision and was subsequently released from the promotion.

Post-UFC career
Over a year after his release from UFC, Duran returned to King of the Cage in June 2014. Duran faced Tony Sanchez at KOTC: Slugfest on June 5, 2014. He won the fight via second round TKO.

Championships and accomplishments
King of the Cage
Interim KOTC Flyweight Championship (One time)
KOTC Flyweight Championship (One time)
KOTC Light Flyweight Championship (One time; current)

Mixed martial arts record

|-
| Won
| align=center| 13–7–1
| Tim Sosa
| Submission (rear naked choke)
| KOTC: Energetic Pursuit
| 
| align=center| 5
| align=center| 
| Ontario, California United States
| 
|-
| Won
| align=center| 12–7–1
| Fard Muhammad
| Decision (unanimous)
| KOTC: Conquistadores
| 
| align=center| 3
| align=center| 5:00
| Ontario, California United States
| 
|-
| Loss
| align=center| 11–7–1
| Shoko Sato
| KO/TKO (strikes)
| Shooto in Korakuen Hall
| 
| align=center| 1
| align=center| 4:58
| Tokyo, Japan
| 
|-
| Loss
| align=center| 11–6–1
| Derrick Mandell
| Decision (split)
| KOTC: Ultimate Collision
| 
| align=center| 5
| align=center| 5:00
| Carlton, Minnesota, United States
| 
|-
| Win
| align=center| 11–5–1
| Andrew Natividad
| Decision (unanimous)
| KOTC: Bitter Rivals
| 
| align=center| 5
| align=center| 5:00
| Ontario, California, United States
| 
|-
| Win
| align=center| 10–5–1
| Eduardo Torres
| Decision (unanimous)
| KOTC: Battle for the Belt
| 
| align=center| 5
| align=center| 5:00
| Highland, California, United States
| 
|-
| Win
| align=center| 9–5–1
| Tony Sanchez
| TKO (punches)
| KOTC: Slugfest
| 
| align=center| 2
| align=center| 1:26
| Highland, California, United States
| 
|-
| Loss
| align=center| 8–5–1
| George Roop
| Decision (unanimous)
| UFC 158
| 
| align=center| 3
| align=center| 5:00
| Montreal, Quebec, Canada
| 
|-
| Loss
| align=center| 8–4–1
| Hugo Viana
| KO (punch)
| The Ultimate Fighter 16 Finale
| 
| align=center| 1
| align=center| 4:05
| Las Vegas, Nevada, United States
| 
|-
| Win
| align=center| 8–3–1
| Francisco Rivera
| Submission (rear-naked choke)
| The Ultimate Fighter 13 Finale
| 
| align=center| 3
| align=center| 1:57
| Las Vegas, Nevada, United States
| 
|-
| Loss
| align=center| 7–3–1
| Takeya Mizugaki
| Decision (split)
| UFC Live: Sanchez vs. Kampmann
| 
| align=center| 3
| align=center| 5:00
| Louisville, Kentucky, United States
| 
|-
| Win
| align=center| 7–2–1
| Kana Hyatt
| Submission (guillotine choke)
| KOTC: Sniper
| 
| align=center| 1
| align=center| 2:03
| San Bernardino, California, United States
| 
|-
| Win
| align=center| 6–2–1
| Maurice Eazel
| Submission (guillotine choke)
| Long Beach Fight Night 8
| 
| align=center| 1
| align=center| 1:18
| Long Beach, California, United States
| 
|-
| Win
| align=center| 5–2–1
| Ryan Diaz
| KO (punch)
| KOTC: Arrival
| 
| align=center| 3
| align=center| 4:57
| Highland, California, United States
| 
|-
| Win
| align=center| 4–2–1
| Greg Guzman
| Decision (unanimous)
| KOTC: Super Stars
| 
| align=center| 3
| align=center| 5:00
| Highland, California, United States
| 
|-
| Loss
| align=center| 3–2–1
| Tommy Vargas
| Decision (unanimous)
| All Star Boxing: Conquest in the Cage 3
| 
| align=center| 3
| align=center| 3:00
| Montebello, California, United States
| 
|-
| Win
| align=center| 3–1–1
| Manny Romero
| TKO (punches)
| AF 2: Apocalypse Fights 2
| 
| align=center| 1
| align=center| 0:37
| Palm Springs, California, United States
| 
|-
| Win
| align=center| 2–1–1
| Ricardo Gallardo
| KO (punches)
| AF: Apocalypse Fights 1
| 
| align=center| 1
| align=center| N/A
| Palm Springs, California, United States
| 
|-
| Win
| align=center| 1–1–1
| Bobby Sanchez
| Submission (triangle choke)
| Invincible: MMA
| 
| align=center| 1
| align=center| 1:15
| Ontario, California, United States
| 
|-
| Draw
| align=center| 0–1–1
| David Aguirre
| Draw
| KOTC: Final Chapter
| 
| align=center| 2
| align=center| 5:00
| San Jacinto, California, United States
| 
|-
| Loss
| align=center| 0–1
| Scott Epstein
| Submission (rear-naked choke)
| PF 1: The Beginning
| 
| align=center| 1
| align=center| 2:40
| Hollywood, California, United States
|

References

External links

Official UFC Profile

Living people
People from Ontario, California
American male mixed martial artists
Mixed martial artists utilizing boxing
Mixed martial artists utilizing Muay Thai
Mixed martial artists utilizing wrestling
Mixed martial artists utilizing Brazilian jiu-jitsu
1983 births
People from Chula Vista, California
People from Redlands, California
Ultimate Fighting Championship male fighters
American Muay Thai practitioners
American practitioners of Brazilian jiu-jitsu